Mark Clarke (born 25 July 1950 in Liverpool, England) is an English musician, bass player and singer, best known for his work with Colosseum and Mountain, as well as brief stints with Uriah Heep and Rainbow.

Career
After seeing the Beatles and many other bands in Liverpool as a young boy at the age of 12, he decided to be a bass player. In 1966 Mark Clarke played with the Kegmen, in 1968 with the Locomotive and late 1968 with St. James Infirmary. Liverpool Echo called him in an article "the Joe Cocker of Liverpool". 

After a year of local gigs he moved to London, where he was introduced to Clem Clempson, who played at that time in Colosseum. After some time Mark was asked by Jon Hiseman to join Colosseum in the summer 1970 and he played in the band until the split late 1971, and again 21 years from the reunion in 1994 till the farewell in 2015. After Colosseum split he was briefly around the turn of the years 1971/1972 a member of Uriah Heep, performing (and co-writing) on one studio track, "The Wizard", on the 1972 album Demons and Wizards. In the beginning of 1973 he became a member of Jon Hiseman's Tempest and played bass on the two Tempest studio albums with Allan Holdsworth, Ollie Halsall and Paul Williams, and a live album issued later. He also played bass on Ken Hensley's solo albums. 

In 1975 he formed Natural Gas with Joey Molland, Jerry Shirley and Peter Wood. He also played shortly with Ritchie Blackmore's Rainbow. In 1980 he started working with Billy Squier and recorded Don't Say No, The Stroke, In the Dark and many other albums with him.  In 1986 he toured with the Monkees, and worked for many years with Davy Jones. Clarke has also worked twice in 1984-1985 and 1995-1996 with Mountain, Ian Hunter and Torque, recording albums with all of them. 

With Colosseum he played again from the reunion in 1994 to the farewell concert at the Shepherd's Bush Empire in London on 28 February 2015.

In 2010 Mark Clarke released his first solo album Moving to the Moon, which was co-produced by Ray DeTone, who also played all guitars on the record.

In 2017 Mark Clarke became a member of a new trio band called JCM, with fellow former members of Colessuem Jon Hiseman and Clem Clempson. The band recorded an album "Heroes" late in 2017 and it was released in April 2018. JCM begun touring Europe on 7 April 2018 but the tour ended after the show on the 22 April in Bonn due Jon Hiseman's illness. Hiseman died in June 2018 which initially appeared to be the end of JCM, however in early 2019 it was announced that band would continue with Ralph Salmins taking over drums. Tours of Europe and the UK took place throughout 2019.

Clarke continues to be a member of Colosseum after their reunion in 2019, as well as contributing to their 2022 album Restoration.

Discography
Colosseum
 1970 – Daughter of Time
 1971 – Colosseum Live
 1994 – Colosseum LiveS – The Reunion Concerts
 1997 – Bread and Circuses
 2003 – Tomorrow's Blues
 2007 – Live05
 2014 – Time On Our Side

Uriah Heep
 1972 – Demons and Wizards

Tempest
 1973 – Tempest
 1974 – Live in London
 1974 – Living in Fear

Natural Gas
 1976 - Natural Gas

Ken Hensley
 1973 - Proud Words on a Dusty Shelf
 1975 – Eager to Please
 1980 – Free Spirit

Richard T. Bear
1979 - Captured Alive

Billy Squier
 1981 - Don't Say No
 1991 - Creatures of Habit

Ian Hunter
 1983 – All of the Good Ones Are Taken

Michael Bolton
 1983 - Michael Bolton

 The Monkees
1986 - Davy Jones / Micky Dolenz / Peter Tork: 20th Anniversary Tour

Mountain
 1985 – Go for Your Life
 1996 – Man's World

Torque
 2003 - 103103

Solo albums
 2010 – Moving to the Moon

JCM
 2018 - Heroes

References

External links
 Let It Rock Interview with Mark Clarke 

Uriah Heep (band) members
English rock bass guitarists
Male bass guitarists
English heavy metal bass guitarists
1950 births
Living people
Musicians from Liverpool
Mountain (band) members
English songwriters
Colosseum (band) members
Rainbow (rock band) members
Tempest (UK band) members